The acronym ANZSOC may refer to:

 Australian and New Zealand Society of Criminology, established by Allen Bartholomew
 Australian and New Zealand Standard Offence Classification, a standard for criminal offence classification published by the Australian Bureau of Statistics; see